nopCommerce is an open-source eCommerce platform based on Microsoft's ASP.NET Core framework and MS SQL Server 2012 (or higher) backend Database.  It provides a catalog frontend and an administration tool backend, allowing shopping cart creation. It is available under the nopCommerce Public License V3 and officially launched in October 2008 for small to medium-sized businesses.

History
nopСommerce development started in 2008 by Andrei Mazulnitsyn in Yaroslavl, Russia. Later on, the company moved to Armenia, Yerevan. Microsoft recognized nopCommerce as significant and included it with Microsoft's Web platform Installer.

The first versions introduced basic functionality such as order processing, attributes, plugins, discounts, tier pricing, news, blogs, private messages, forums, tax and shipping support.
In June 2010, a new data access layer was introduced in version 1.70.
Version 2.00 (August 2011) launched nopCommerce as an ASP.NET MVC based solution.
Later in 2011 nopCommerce moved to ASP.NET MVC 4.
Versions 3.00 and 3.10 were extended to include multi-store and multi-vendor features and to simplify the product logic. In versions 3.50, 3.60, and 3.70, a modern and responsive template was included. Version 3.80 was released with a brand new and responsive admin area with basic and advanced views and with the capability to run in web farms. Version 3.90 contains significant improvements in marketing and content management functionality, performance optimization, and the admin area UI and UX. 
In version 4.00 nopCommerce was moved to ASP.NET Core 2.0. Starting from version 4.20, the platform provides support of UNIX-based systems, and since version 4.30 it supports MySQL. Version 4.40 has implemented asynchronous programming which supposedly improves performance significantly, support for PostgreSQL database, and Full web farm support which it previously lacked. From version 4.40, nopCommerce started supporting minor versions.
In the latest version 4.60.0, nopCommerce was migrated to .NET 7.

The version release cycle is 7–8 months.

Usage
As of February 2022, Builtwith.com reports that 54,139 websites have used nopCommerce.
The installation package was downloaded more than 3 million times. It is used by such brands as Volvo, Puma, Reebok, DHC skincare, Columbia, Medindia, and Speedo.

Business model
nopCommerce can be downloaded, installed and used free of charge. The community forum provides free support. There is an optional fee for white-labeling, premium support services, and partnership program. Until 2014, the documentation was downloaded on a paid basis and now is available free of charge.

Community
nopCommerce has an active community of users and developers, which provides assistance to other users; contributes with code, plugins and other extensions; and helps with planning the roadmap. As of February 2022, it has 140 partners in 140 countries providing custom development, graphic theme creation, and other services.  As of January 2019, the stackoverflow.com has more than 1,000 questions tagged "nopCommerce". Current marketplace offers more than thousand plug-ins and themes. nopCommerce has been translated to 56 languages.

On 30 October 2015, the first conference of the nopCommerce community #NopDevDays took place in Amsterdam, Netherlands, attracting more than 65 delegates from 14 countries. nopCommerce Days was the second conference in Amsterdam in October 2016, which hosted 160 attendees from 30 countries and was a 2-day event with 19 presentations and 4 workshops. The third nopCommerce Days conference was held in November 2017 in New York, and the fourth in November 2018 in Las Vegas.
In 2016 nopCommerce community started organizing webinars and meetups around the world.

Awards and recognition
In 2010 and 2011 nopCommerce reached the final in the Packt Open Source E-Commerce Award. nopCommerce is in the featured and top 5 most downloaded applications provided by Microsoft Web Platform Installer. 
In 2013, nopCommerce was chosen as the best finance app by Russian WebReady awards.

In January 2016, nopCommerce won CMScritic's "Best eCommerce for SMB" award.

In April 2020, nopCommerce was included in Emerce 100 ranking.

Benefits of nopCommerce
 Ease of installation
 SSL Certificate Compatibility
 Reliable and bug-free
 Third-party payment integration system
 Easy installation of themes and plugins
 Appropriate documentation
 Easy setup in visual studio software
 Change the favicon icon in nopCommerce

See also

 Comparison of shopping cart software

References 

Free e-commerce software
Free software programmed in C Sharp
Free and open-source software